David Michel may refer to:

 David Michel (c.1735–1805), British member of parliament
 David Michel (American politician) (born 1974), Member of Connecticut House of Representatives